Nicolás Goldbart is an Argentine Film director and film editor.

He wrote and directed the movie Phase 7. Some of the films he's edited have been critically well received: El Bonaerense (2002), El Custodio (2006), and others.

Filmography
 Mundo Grúa (1999) aka Crane World
 Bonanza (En vías de extinción) (2001)
 Modelo 73 (2001)
 Naikor, la estación de servicio (2001)
 El Descanso (2002)
 El Bonaerense (2002)
 Kill (2002)
 Hoy y mañana (2003) aka Today and Tomorrow
 El Fondo del Mar (2003) aka The Bottom of the Sea
 Familia Rodante (2004) aka Rolling Family
 Historias breves IV: Más quel mundo (2004) aka More Than the World
 Sofacama (2006) aka Sofabed
 El Custodio (2006) aka The Minder
 The Paranoids (2008)
 Fase 7 (2011) aka Phase 7
La cordillera (2017)

References

External links
 
 

Argentine film editors
Living people
Year of birth missing (living people)
Place of birth missing (living people)